Galasa cuprealis is a species of snout moth in the genus Galasa. It was described by George Hampson in 1906 and is known from Paraguay.

References

Moths described in 1906
Chrysauginae